Gao Fei, also known as Gao Ying, is a Chinese actor and singer. She has been called a "small Carina Lau"  and the "number 1 rebellious actress"  by the press for her performances.

Her first leading role was in Grieved Gunfighter (1994), using Gao Ying as her screen name. She has acted in more than 20 films and over 300 television episodes. Since 2004, she has been using Gao Fei as her stage name. A a singer, her album, Extraordinary Fei,  sold over 100,000 copies.

Early life
Gao Fei was born and raised in Beijing, China. Her parents are professors in computer science. They initially did not approve her idea to study acting. She achieved the highest score in the entrance exam for Shanghai Theatre Academy. Her parents continued to disapprove of her decision to study acting and her mother attempted to stop having a relationship with Gao Fei. Gao wrote her mother letters and eventually, after three months, her family approved of her studies.

Career

1993-1995: Early career
While she was a student, she started acting as leading actresses in several movies including “Grieved Gunfighter” (1994), “Romantic Interlude of Red Hats” (1994), and “River of No Return” (1995). She also played in Shanghai Triad (1995) directed by Zhang Yimou.

1996-2001: Television series
In 1996, about the same time as she graduated from Shanghai Theatre Academy, she started her acting as leading actresses in several TV series: “Shanghai Romance,” “Countryside Sister,” “Rumbling in Shanghai,” “Majestic Presence,” and “The Interests of the Family.”

2002-2003: Back to films
In 2002, she took a break from TV series and played as leading actresses in two movies “I Am Here for You” and “Seducing Mr.”

2004–2009: Back to televisions again
After taking a break from acting, she started using the stage name Gao Fei, and started acting as rebellious or villainous characters, earning the nickname “the number one rebellious actress.” She appeared in many TV series including “My Career as an Agent” (2004),  “Evil Fire” (2005), “Marriage Code” (2006), “ Would Like to Fly” (2007), “An Epic of A Woman” (2008), and “Agent Zero : The Secret Agent” (2009).

During this period, she worked with musicians Chris Babida, Michael Lai and Pang Long, to produce her debut solo album Extraordinary Fei. The album sold over 100,000 copies. She won the Best New Talent Award at Sprite Music Awards.

2010-present: Movie associate producer
In 2001, she wrote and worked as an associate producer and a leading actress for the movie “You Deserve to Be Single.” The movie won seven nominations including the best picture of the China Movie Channel Media Awards at Shanghai International Film Festival in 2010.

Filmography

Music albums

Awards and honors

Elected as A member of Chinese Film Association, 2005
China-American Cultural Awards – Charm of Characters Award (Won), 2006
Sprite Music Awards – Best New Talent Award (Won), 2008		 	
Shanghai International Film Festival Best Picture Nominee, Movie  “You Deserve to Be Single” as an associate producer and a leading actress, 2010

Commercial and Humanitarian Activities
Global Spokesperson,  FED women’s shoes, 2002–2008	
Ambassador, China Charity Federation, Since 2006				
Ambassador, Shanghai Lao Fengxiang Jewelry, 2007–2009
Partner, Beijing Star Shining International Film and Artists Co., Limited, Since 2007

References

20th-century Chinese actresses
21st-century Chinese actresses
Chinese film actresses
Living people
Actresses from Beijing
Chinese stage actresses
Chinese women singers
Chinese film producers
Year of birth missing (living people)